Haig Sare (born 25 March 1982) is a former Australian rugby union player. He played as centre or winger for the Western Force in the Super Rugby competition. He played schoolboy rugby for the Shore School in Sydney; represented Australia "A" and Australian U21s; and also had a season with French Rugby champions Biarritz Olympique. Sare retired from professional rugby in 2011 following injury.

After retirement he took up coaching and from 2013 to 2015 was head coach of the Warringah Rats. Sare left that post in early 2015 to move to Queensland. He is now a real estate broker.

Career
Sare has represented Australia at Under 21s level; played for Australia A; and also played for Biarritz Olympique in France.

References

External links
 Stats on It's Rugby

1982 births
Australian rugby union players
People educated at Sydney Church of England Grammar School
Biarritz Olympique players
Western Force players
Living people
Rugby union wings
Rugby union centres